Jiang Yukun (1913–1981) was a t'ai chi ch'uan master. He was a student of grandmaster Yang Chengfu (who is the grandson of creator of Yang-syle t'ai chi ch'uan, Yang Luchan). Although he studied different t'ai chi ch'uan styles like Chen, Wu, Sun and Li, his specialism was Yang-syle.

Born in Hangzhou, Zhejiang, Jiang Yukun began martial arts training at the age of 7 with his uncle. Then his t'ai chi ch'uan training began with Han Ch'ing-t'ang. In Zhejiang provincial Wushu Academy he became the student of Yang Chengfu at his age of 30's. After passing the entrance exam of Nanjing China Central Wushu Institute, he studied Xingyiquan, Pa Kua, Chin Na and Sanshou, Wudang Sword respectively with masters Chiang Jung-Ch'iao, Huang Pai-nien, Wu Chun-shan, Liu Pai-ch'uan and Huang Yuan-hsiu.

In 1930 he became the champion in Zhejiang, in 1933 he scored the highest point in graduate exam of Nanjing China Central Wushu Institute, in 1948 he became the national champion of wrestling, in 1956 he got 2 titles in national Wushu Championship, in 1975 he was invited to be the national Wushu trainer.

Jiang Yukun studied Da Jia (the original Big Frame) in Yang-style t'ai chi system from a martial arts approach. He learned and Xiao Jia (the Small Frame) Small Frame Yang Style from Gong Rongtian, who was a disciple of Yang Ban-Shou (the 2nd generation successor of the Yang Family). Jiang also learned Chen-style t'ai chi ch'uan from Master Chen Ziming, the 17th generation successor of the Chen Family.

One of the heritages of Yang Chengfu, the traditional ], could come to the present day via master Jiang Yukun. This rarely practised form was passed on to his students.  has high and low stands, beautiful circular moves and powerful yet relaxed actions with much details. 43 form has been created by Yang Chengfu just a few years before his death and undergone small edit by Master Jiang Yukun.

References

External links
(archive)
 Long Feng Taiji
 Wushan.net (archive)
 Wuji Taiji masters (archive)
 Beijing Kung Fu (archive)

1913 births
1981 deaths
Chinese tai chi practitioners
Sportspeople from Hangzhou